Seattle's history of professional sports began in 1915 with the Pacific Coast Hockey Association (PCHA)'s Seattle Metropolitans, the first American ice hockey team to win the Stanley Cup. Seattle's professional sports culture currently includes seven major professional teams and many teams in minor leagues. Seattle also boasts a strong history in collegiate sports, with two National Collegiate Athletic Association (NCAA) Division I universities and one NCAA Division II university.

Major professional teams

At 4.1 million residents in 2023, Greater Seattle is now the 15th-largest metropolitan area (between metro Detroit at 4.4 million and the Twin Cities at 3.7 million) in the United States. Rapid 21st-century population growth in the counties surrounding the City of Seattle (King County; Pierce County, Washington and Snohomish County) and the satellite cities in these counties (Bellevue, WA; Tacoma, WA and Everett, WA) has quickly expanded both the variety and the level of talent in professional sports teams residing in the Puget Sound region.    

Professional soccer in Seattle has always involved the Seattle Sounders, whose original team played in the defunct NASL in the 1970s through to its demise in 1983. The name lived on in a second incarnation of the team, which played in the second level of US soccer from 1994 through 2008. In November 2007, Major League Soccer announced that Seattle would host the league's fifteenth franchise to start play in 2009. The team held a vote among its fan base for the team's name between March 27 and 31, 2008 and Seattle Sounders FC was chosen. The current version of the Sounders plays at Lumen Field.

In 1976, the NFL's Seattle Seahawks began play. The Seahawks played at the Kingdome until its implosion in 2000. The Seahawks now play in Lumen Field.

In 1977, following years of legal wrangling over the move of the Seattle Pilots to Milwaukee (to become the Milwaukee Brewers), the MLB awarded Seattle a new baseball franchise, the Seattle Mariners. From 1977 the Mariners played in the Kingdome until mid-season 1999 when the team moved across the street to what is now known as T-Mobile Park, where they continue to play today. 

The WNBA's Seattle Storm arrived in Seattle in 2000, and played at KeyArena through the 2018 season. After KeyArena was closed for its reconfiguration as today's Climate Pledge Arena, the Storm split their 2019 home games between Angel of the Winds Arena in Everett and Alaska Airlines Arena on the University of Washington campus. The WNBA's 2020 season, held amidst COVID-19, was completely moved to Bradenton, Florida. When the league returned to home markets in 2021, the Storm played all home games at Angel of the Winds Arena, and returned to Climate Pledge Arena in 2022. 

In 2013, Seattle's professional women's soccer team OL Reign, including several members of the World Cup winning US women's national team, opened their first season as Seattle Reign FC in the National Women's Soccer League at Starfire Sports Complex and played at Memorial Stadium in Seattle Center through 2018. Starting in the 2019 NWSL season, the rebranded Reign FC began play on their new home pitch at Tacoma's Cheney Stadium. During the 2019–20 offseason, the parent company of prominent French club Olympique Lyonnais bought a majority stake in Reign FC, and soon rebranded the side yet again as OL Reign. The team returned to Seattle in 2022 and now shares Lumen Field with the Seahawks and Sounders.

In September 2012, the Seattle City Council agreed to move forward towards building a $490 million new arena in the SoDo, Seattle neighborhood. This commitment was intended to help bring the NBA back to Seattle along with the NHL. Instead, five years later, on December 3, 2017, the Council approved the expansion of Key Arena in Seattle Center, under the direction of the Oak View Group. Three days later, on December 6, 2017, the NHL awarded a new franchise opportunity to Seattle. In 1976, Seattle was awarded a conditional NHL franchise; however, this opportunity did not come to fruition. The new professional hockey team was originally expected to join the league in the 2020-21 season, given an on-time completion of the Arena expansion project. On December 4, 2018, the NHL Board of Governors unanimously approved Seattle's bid to become the 32nd NHL team, being the Seattle Kraken. their inaugural season in the revamped Climate Pledge Arena began October 2021. The new Seattle franchise expanded and rebalanced the league to four 8-team divisions, equal to the NFL in size.

In 2017, the Seattle Seawolves became one of the founding teams of the newly-formed Major League Rugby. The Seawolves won back-to-back titles in the first two seasons of the league's existence, defeating the Glendale Raptors 23–19 in 2018 and San Diego Legion 26–23 in 2019.

Current major professional teams

Championships
As of 2023, the city of Seattle enjoys a total of 21 national & international professional team championships, including one Stanley Cup, one NBA Championship, one Super Bowl, four WNBA championships, four U.S. Open Cups, one MLS Supporters' Shield, two MLS Cups, one CONCACAF Champions League Cup, three NWSL Shields, one The Women's Cup trophy and two MLR Championship Shields. Nineteen of these twenty-one titles were won in the 21st century, over the course of 18 years (2004-2022). 

Seattle's first professional sports championship was brought to the city by the Seattle Metropolitans in 1917, when they became the first American team to win the coveted Stanley Cup by beating the Montreal Canadiens three games to one. They returned to the Stanley Cup finals twice more. Their first return, again versus Montreal, was in 1919; that series was cancelled due to an outbreak of influenza with the two teams tied at 2–2–1. The Metropolitans last went to the Stanley Cup finals in 1920, when they lost to the Ottawa Senators.

Led by Lenny Wilkens, the Seattle SuperSonics made it to the NBA Finals in two consecutive years in the late 1970s. In 1978 they lost the championship series to the Washington Bullets in seven games, but rebounded in 1979 to defeat the Bullets by four games to one to win the NBA Championship. The next time the Sonics made it to NBA Finals was in 1996 when they met the Chicago Bulls, to whom they lost the series in six games.

Another national basketball championship trophy arrived in 2004, when the Seattle Storm defeated the Connecticut Sun two games to one to win the WNBA championship. The Seattle Storm won their second WNBA title in 2010, beating the Atlanta Dream in 3 games. Eight years later, the Storm swept the Washington Mystics in 2018 to take their third national championship. The team earned a fourth WNBA title in 2020 in a sweep against the Las Vegas Aces with all games played at a quarantined facility in Florida.

The Seattle Mariners have won the American League West Pennant three times – in 1995, 1997, and, most recently, in 2001, after a record 116-win season. The Mariners, however, have yet to win an American League Championship Series or participate in a World Series Championship. After the then-longest playoff drought in professional American sports (21 years), the Mariners clinched their next trip to the post-season on September 30, 2022 by defeating the Oakland Athletics with a walk-off home run in the ninth inning in front of a sold-out crowd at T-Mobile Park.   

Seattle Sounders FC won the U.S. Open Cup in the team's inaugural season of 2009. The Sounders won the U.S. Open Cup again in 2010, becoming the first MLS team to achieve back-to-back U.S. Open Cup Titles. Seattle continued its U.S. Open Cup dominance in the 2011 campaign, becoming the fourth team ever to win the tournament in three consecutive years (the last being the Greek American AA in 1967–69). The Sounders beat the Chicago Fire 2–0 in front of a then record-setting MLS crowd of 35,615 at CenturyLink Field (now Lumen Field) on October 4, 2011. On September 16, 2014, the Sounders captured their fourth U.S. Open Cup title, overcoming the Philadelphia Union – on the Union's home pitch – in extra time by a final score of 3–1.  On October 25, 2014, in front of a crowd of 57,673 at CenturyLink Field, the Sounders topped the LA Galaxy by a score of 2–0 to claim their first MLS Supporters' Shield. The Sounders captured their first Western Conference title when they defeated the Colorado Rapids by an aggregate score of 3–1 on November 27, 2016, in Commerce City, Colorado. Then, on December 10, 2016 in front of a crowd of 36,000 at BMO Field, the Sounders won their first MLS Cup against Toronto FC in a penalty shootout by a score of 5–4. The following season - on December 9, 2017 - the Sounders returned to the MLS Cup against Toronto FC (held again at BMO Field). This time, the Sounders lost the Cup to the home team by a score of 0–2. On November 10, 2019, the Sounders played in their third MLS Cup against Toronto FC, winning 3–1 to achieve their second title with a club-record home attendance of 69,274. On May 4, 2022 - in front of a home crowd of 68,751 - the Sounders became the first MLS team to win the 2022 CONCACAF Champions League, defeating Mexican side Pumas UNAM with an aggregate score of 5 goals to 2.   

In 2014 – the second regular season of the U.S. National Women's Soccer League – Seattle Reign FC (known as OL Reign after being acquired by the ownership group of Olympique Lyonnais) attained the highest season point total of all nine league teams to receive their first NWSL Shield award. The Reign became the league's first team to repeat this achievement when they defeated the Boston Breakers at Memorial Stadium on August 26, 2015. On October 1, 2022, the OL Reign clinched their third NWSL Shield by defeating the Orlando Pride 3–0.      

The Seahawks have won nine NFL division titles, including two in the AFC West and seven in the NFC West. They won the NFC championship in 2006, earning them their first trip to Super Bowl XL, where they lost to the Pittsburgh Steelers 21–10. In 2014, the Seahawks defeated the San Francisco 49ers at CenturyLink Field, to clinch their second NFC title and a berth in Super Bowl XLVIII, where they routed the Denver Broncos 43–8 to win their first Lombardi trophy. The following season, the Seahawks overcame a deficit in the NFC championship game with the Green Bay Packers in the final minutes of the fourth quarter to claim their first back-to-back George Halas trophies. In Super Bowl XLIX at the University of Phoenix Stadium (now State Farm Stadium), the Seahawks missed the opportunity to claim their second Super Bowl win in the final seconds of the fourth quarter, falling to the New England Patriots by a score of 28–24.

Other teams
The Seattle Thunderbirds are a Major Junior league ice hockey team that plays at the ShoWare Center. The Thunderbirds arrived in Seattle in 1977 as the Seattle Breakers, before changing to their current name in 1985. They play in the Western Hockey League, one of three components of the Canadian Hockey League, traditionally a major feeder system for the NHL. The Thunderbirds won their first WHL Ed Chynoweth Cup on May 14, 2017, against the Regina Pats by a score of 4 games to 2.

Originally arriving in 1974, the men's soccer team Seattle Sounders played in Seattle until 1983 when the North American Soccer League collapsed due to overexpansion. The Seattle Sounders were brought back in 1994 and played in the USL First Division at what was then known as Qwest Field. Six years later the men's team was joined by a women's team of the same name (now known as the Seattle Sounder Angels) which plays in a nearby suburb, Tukwila. In 2008, the USL incarnation of the Sounders played its last season, and in 2009 Seattle Sounders FC began playing in MLS, America's top soccer division. The Sounders play league matches at the since-renamed Lumen Field, but use the Starfire Sports Complex in Tukwila for matches in the Lamar Hunt U.S. Open Cup (except when they host the final). OL Reign was established in 2013 and compete in the National Women's Soccer League; the team returned to Seattle in 2022 after three seasons at Cheney Stadium in Tacoma and now shares Lumen Field with the Sounders and Seahawks. It was originally named Seattle Reign FC, after a women's basketball team in the former American Basketball League, and played at Starfire and Memorial Stadium. Upon moving to Tacoma in 2019, they changed their name to Reign FC, and after being purchased in 2020 by the parent company of French Ligue 1 power Olympique Lyonnais, rebranded again as OL Reign.

Current teams

Championships
The Seattle Sounders (USL) won the A-League championship in 1995 and 1996 and the US First Division championship in 2005 and 2007.

The Seattle SeaDogs defeated the Houston Hotshots two games to none for the Continental Indoor Soccer League championship in 1997.

The Washington Stealth defeated the Toronto Rock 15–11 at Xfinity Arena - now Angel of the Winds Arena  in Everett for the National Lacrosse League Champion's Cup in 2010.

The Seattle Sockeye won the USA Ultimate Club Championships in 2004, 2006, 2007, and 2019. They won the gold medal at the World Ultimate Club Championships (WUCC) in 1997 in Vancouver, British Columbia. They also won the silver medal at the World Ultimate Games (WUGC) in 2008 in Vancouver and at WUCC in 2010 in Prague, Czech Republic.

The Seattle Grizzlies won the USAFL Division 3 Title in 2017 as well as the Division 2 Title in 2008.

The Seattle Thunderbirds were the WHL champions for the first time in the 2016–17 season.

College and high school sports

College sports

The University of Washington, Seattle University, and Seattle Pacific University field teams in a variety of sports, including football, basketball, and rowing. Their teams are known as the Huskies, Redhawks, and Falcons, respectively. The Husky football team has a following that ranks with those of the major professional teams in the city. In 1991, the Huskies shared an NCAA Division I collegiate football championship with the Hurricanes of the University of Miami. In 2005 the Huskies volleyball team won the NCAA title.

A Huskies rowing team represented the United States at the 1936 Summer Olympics in Berlin, Germany and defeated the Nazi Germany team to win the gold medal. The story was later chronicled in the 2013 book The Boys in the Boat.

In addition to the Seattle-based teams, the Spokane-based Gonzaga Bulldogs play one men's basketball game each season at Climate Pledge Arena in an event billed as the Battle in Seattle.

High school and youth sports
Rugby is growing in Seattle at the high school and youth level, with several schools adding programs, such as Shorecrest, Roosevelt and Nathan Hale High School.

Former teams

Former major professional teams
The first professional team to play in Seattle was the PCHA Seattle Metropolitans, which played in the Seattle Ice Arena between 1915 and 1924. 
In 1967, the NBA's Seattle SuperSonics (more commonly known as the "Sonics") became the first modern-day major professional sports franchise in Seattle. However, in 2008, the Sonics' ownership group moved the team to Oklahoma City. 
In 1969, the Major League Baseball Seattle Pilots were established, but only played one year in Seattle before moving to Milwaukee. The Pilots' sole season was immortalized in Jim Bouton's book Ball Four.

Other former teams

Other sports
Swimmer Helene Madison (1913–1970) of Seattle won three gold medals at the 1932 Olympic Games.

The Seattle Dojo, which was founded before 1907, is the oldest judo academy in the United States.

Sporting events
Seattle has been host to a number of important sporting events. It hosted the NFL Pro Bowl in 1977, the Major League Baseball All-Star Game in 1979 and 2001, the NBA All-Star Game in 1974 and 1987, the MLS Cup in 2009 and 2019, the Goodwill Games in 1990 and the NCAA Final Four in 1984, 1989 and 1995. On July 22, 2017 at KeyArena, the Seattle Storm hosted the WNBA All-Star Game for the first time. Seattle will host the 2023 Major League Baseball All-Star Game at T-Mobile Park. 

In 1998, the Seattle City Council rejected a resolution 8-to-1 that would have allowed Seattle to be considered for the 2012 Summer Olympics.

The Seattle Marathon has taken place annually since 1970.

Seattle has hosted several United States men's national soccer team and United States women's national soccer team events in the past, including men's FIFA World Cup qualifying matches in 1976 and 2013.

Lumen Field has hosted CONCACAF Gold Cup matches in 2005 and 2013. The stadium was also proposed as a 2016 Copa América venue and was considered, along with Husky Stadium, in the failed U.S. bid for the 2022 FIFA World Cup.

2026 FIFA World Cup
Lumen Field is one of eleven  U.S. venues which will host matches during the 2026 FIFA World Cup.

See also
 Ice hockey in Seattle
 History of professional soccer in Seattle
 History of the Seattle Mariners

Notes and references

 
Culture of Seattle
Tourist attractions in Seattle
Seattle Sports